Jerome Evans may refer to:

Jerome Evans (American football) (died 1995), American football coach
Jerome Evans (singer) (1938–2003), American singer
Silkski (Jerome Albert Evans, Jr.), American producer and rap artist